Edwin ap Hywel (died ) was a 10th-century king of Deheubarth in Wales of the High Middle Ages.

One of three sons of Hywel Dda, he divided his father's realm with his brothers Rhodri and Owain according to Welsh law. The sons of Idwal were able to reclaim Gwynedd for its traditional dynasty, however. In 952, two of Idwal's sons, Iago and Ieuaf, invaded Deheubarth and penetrated as far as Dyfed. The sons of Hywel retaliated by invading the north in 954, reaching as far north as the Conwy valley before being defeated at Llanrwst and being obliged to retreat to Ceredigion.

His brother Rhodri predeceased him and his brother Owain survived him. The kingdom would later be ruled by Owain's descendants.

References 

Monarchs of Deheubarth
950s deaths
10th-century Welsh monarchs
Year of birth unknown
Year of death uncertain